Aleksander Śliwka  (born 24 May 1995) is a Polish professional volleyball player. He is a member of the Poland national team, a participant in the Olympic Games Tokyo 2020, 2018 World Champion, and a two–time Champions League winner (2021, 2022). At the professional club level, he plays for ZAKSA Kędzierzyn-Koźle.

Career

Clubs
During the 2017–18 PlusLiga season, he was one of the main players of Asseco Resovia. In May 2018, he moved to ZAKSA Kędzierzyn-Koźle.

National team
In 2015, he was called up to the Polish national team by the head coach Stéphane Antiga. After the training camp in Spała, he joined the team led by coach Andrzej Kowal which took part in the 2015 European Games.

On 30 September 2018, Poland achieved its 3rd title of the World Champion. Poland beat Brazil in the final and defended the title from 2014.

Honours

Clubs
 CEV Champions League
  2020/2021 – with ZAKSA Kędzierzyn-Koźle
  2021/2022 – with ZAKSA Kędzierzyn-Koźle

 National championships
 2018/2019  Polish Cup, with ZAKSA Kędzierzyn-Koźle
 2018/2019  Polish Championship, with ZAKSA Kędzierzyn-Koźle
 2019/2020  Polish SuperCup, with ZAKSA Kędzierzyn-Koźle
 2020/2021  Polish SuperCup, with ZAKSA Kędzierzyn-Koźle
 2020/2021  Polish Cup, with ZAKSA Kędzierzyn-Koźle
 2021/2022  Polish Cup, with ZAKSA Kędzierzyn-Koźle
 2021/2022  Polish Championship, with ZAKSA Kędzierzyn-Koźle
 2022/2023  Polish Cup, with ZAKSA Kędzierzyn-Koźle

Youth national team
 2013  CEV U19 European Championship
 2013  European Youth Olympic Festival
 2014  CEV U20 European Championship

Individual awards
 2019: Polish Cup – Most Valuable Player
 2020: Polish SuperCup – Most Valuable Player
 2021: CEV Champions League – Most Valuable Player
 2023: Polish Cup – Most Valuable Player

State awards
 2018:  Gold Cross of Merit

References

External links

 
 Player profile at PlusLiga.pl 
 
 
 Player profile at Volleybox.net

1995 births
Living people
People from Jawor
Sportspeople from Lower Silesian Voivodeship
Polish men's volleyball players
Olympic volleyball players of Poland
Volleyball players at the 2020 Summer Olympics
European Games competitors for Poland
Volleyball players at the 2015 European Games
Projekt Warsaw players
Resovia (volleyball) players
AZS Olsztyn players
ZAKSA Kędzierzyn-Koźle players
Outside hitters